The Infeld–Van der Waerden symbols, sometimes called simply Van der Waerden symbols, are an invariant symbol associated to the Lorentz group used in quantum field theory. They are named after Leopold Infeld and Bartel Leendert van der Waerden.

The Infeld–Van der Waerden symbols are index notation for Clifford multiplication of covectors on left handed spinors giving a right-handed spinors or vice versa, i.e. they are off diagonal blocks of gamma matrices. The symbols are typically denoted in Van der Waerden notation as

and so have one Lorentz index (m), one left-handed (undotted Greek), and one right-handed (dotted Greek) Weyl spinor index. They satisfy 

They need not be constant, however, and can therefore be formulated on curved space time.

Background
The existence of this invariant symbol follows from a result in the representation theory of the Lorentz group or more properly its Lie algebra.

 and 

while the tangent vectors live in the vector representation 

The tensor product of one left and right fundamental representation is the vector representation,. A dual statement is that the tensor product of the vector, left, and right fundamental representations contains the trivial representation which is in fact generated by the construction of the Lie algebra representations through the Clifford algebra (see below)

Infeld–Van der Waerden symbols and representations of the Clifford algebra
Consider the space of positive Weyl spinors  of a Lorentzian vector space  with dual . 
Then the negative Weyl spinors can be identified with the vector space  of complex conjugate dual spinors. 
The Weyl spinors implement "two halves of a Clifford algebra representation" i.e. they come with a multiplication by covectors implemented as maps

and 
 
which we will call Infeld–Van der Waerden maps. Note that in a natural way we can also think of the maps as a sesquilinear map associating a vector to a left and righthand spinor
 
respectively . 

That the Infeld–Van der Waerden maps implement "two halves of a Clifford algebra representation" means that for covectors 
 
resp. 
,
so that if we define

then 

Therefore  extends to a proper Clifford algebra representation .

The Infeld–Van der Waerden maps are real (or hermitian) in the sense that the complex conjugate dual maps 
 
coincides (for a real covector ) :
.
Likewise we have .

Using local frames of the (co)tangent bundle and a Weyl spinor bundle,  the construction carries over to a differentiable manifold with a spinor bundle.

Applications
The  symbols are of fundamental importance for calculations in quantum field theory in curved spacetime, and in supersymmetry. In the presence of a tetrad  for "soldering" local Lorentz indices to tangent indices, the contracted version  can also be thought of as a soldering form for building a tangent vector out of a pair of left and right Weyl spinors.

Conventions
In flat Minkowski space, A standard component representation is in terms of the Pauli matrices, hence the  notation. In an orthonormal basis with a standard spin frame, the conventional components are
Note that these are the blocks of the gamma matrices in the Weyl Chiral basis convention. 
There are, however, many conventions.

References 

Mathematical physics
Representation theory of Lie groups
Spinors